Dylan Joseph Cash (born November 30, 1994) is an American child actor, known for his role as Michael Corinthos on ABC's daytime drama General Hospital.

Career
He began the role, on General Hospital, on a recurring basis in March 2002, but was put on contract in April 2005 following increased story-line. He was released from his contract in April 2008, as show executives wanted to explore recasting and ultimately aging the character.  As a result, Cash's Michael suffered a gunshot wound to the head and fell into a "permanent" coma. Cash last aired on May 16, 2008, as Michael was checked into a facility for his state. Dylan returned to General Hospital on December 29, 2008 for one episode, when his TV parents Sonny and Carly Corinthos visited Michael at the hospital on his birthday. He also appeared in the 2004 hit Fat Albert. He was in Sabrina the Teenage Witch as Billy.

Filmography
The Cat That Looked at a King (2004) (V) as Boy
Fat Albert (2004) as Emmitt
The Polar Express (2004) (voice) as Boy on Train
Malcolm in the Middle
Judging Amy
Bad Santa (2003) (uncredited) as Kid on Bike
Apple Valley Knights (2002) ('TV Series) as Wyatt
General Hospital (2002–08) (TV Series) as Michael Morgan Corinthos III (March 2002–May 2008; December 2008)
All You Need (2001) (as Dylan Joseph Cash) as Dylan Rempley
Terminator: The Sarah Connor Chronicles (2008) as Bryon Dawson
Opposite Day (2009) as Chaz

References

External links

1994 births
American male child actors
American male film actors
American male soap opera actors
American male television actors
Living people
Male actors from Los Angeles